1993 was designated as:
 International Year for the World's Indigenous People

The year 1993 in the Kwajalein Atoll in the Marshall Islands had only 364 days, since its calendar advanced 24 hours to the Eastern Hemisphere side of the International Date Line, skipping August 21, 1993.

Events

January
 January 1
 Czechoslovakia ceases to exist, as the Czech Republic and Slovakia separate in the Dissolution of Czechoslovakia.
 The European Economic Community eliminates trade barriers and creates a European single market.
 January 3 – In Moscow, Presidents George H. W. Bush (United States) and Boris Yeltsin (Russia) sign the second Strategic Arms Reduction Treaty.
 January 5
 US$7.4 million is stolen from the Brink's Armored Car Depot in Rochester, New York, in the fifth largest robbery in U.S. history.
 , a Liberian-registered oil tanker, runs aground off the Scottish island of Mainland, Shetland, causing a massive oil spill.
 January 6
 Douglas Hurd is the first high-ranking British official to visit Argentina since the Falklands War.
 January 6–20 – The Bombay riots take place in Mumbai.
 January 7 – The Fourth Republic of Ghana is inaugurated, with Jerry Rawlings as president.
 January 8–17 – The Braer Storm of January 1993, the most intense extratropical cyclone on record for the northern Atlantic Ocean, occurs.
 January 13
 The Chemical Weapons Convention (CWC) is signed.
 Iraq disarmament crisis: US, British and French aircraft attack Iraqi Surface to Air Missile sites in Southern Iraq.
 January 14 – The Polish ferry  sinks off the coast of Rügen in the Baltic Sea, killing 54 people.
 January 19 – Iraq disarmament crisis: Iraq refuses to allow UNSCOM inspectors to use its own aircraft to fly into Iraq and begins military operations in the demilitarized zone between Iraq and Kuwait, and the northern Iraqi no-fly zones. U.S. forces fire approximately 40 Tomahawk cruise missiles at Baghdad factories linked to Iraq's illegal nuclear weapons program (→ January 1993 airstrikes on Iraq). Iraq then informs UNSCOM that it will be able to resume its flights.
 January 20 – Bill Clinton is sworn in as the 42nd President of the United States.
 January 24 – In Turkey, thousands protest against the murder of journalist Uğur Mumcu.
 January 25 – Social Democrat Poul Nyrup Rasmussen succeeds Conservative Poul Schlüter as Prime Minister of Denmark.
 January 26 – Václav Havel is elected President of the Czech Republic.

February 

 February 4 – Members of the right-wing Austrian Freedom Party of Austria split to form the Liberal Forum in protest against the increasing nationalistic bent of the party.
 February 10
 Lien Chan is named by Lee Teng-hui to succeed Hau Pei-tsun as Premier of the Republic of China.
 Mani pulite scandal: Italian legislator Claudio Martelli resigns, followed by various politicians over the next two weeks.
 February 14
 Glafcos Clerides defeats incumbent George Vasiliou in the Cypriot presidential election.
 Albert Zafy defeats Didier Ratsiraka in the Madagascar presidential election.
 February 22 – United Nations Security Council Resolution 808 is voted on, deciding that "an international tribunal shall be established" to prosecute violations of international law in Yugoslavia. The tribunal is established on May 25 by Resolution 827.
 February 26 – World Trade Center bombing: In New York City, a van bomb parked below the North Tower of the World Trade Center explodes, killing six people and injuring over one thousand.

March
 March 5 – Macedonian Palair Flight 301, an F-100 on a flight to Zürich, crashes shortly after take-off from Skopje, killing 83 of the 97 on board.
 March 8 – The Moon moves into its nearest point to Earth, called perigee, at the same time as its fullest phase of the Lunar Cycle. The Moon appears to be 14% bigger and 30% brighter than the year's other full moons. The next time these two events coincided was in 2008.
 March 11 – Janet Reno is confirmed by the United States Senate and sworn in the next day, becoming the first female Attorney General of the United States.
 March 12
 1993 Bombay bombings: Several bombs explode in Bombay, India, killing 257 and injuring hundreds more.
 North Korea nuclear weapons program: North Korea announces that it plans to withdraw from the Nuclear Nonproliferation Treaty and refuses to allow inspectors access to nuclear sites, beginning the 1993-94 North Korean Nuclear Crisis.
 March 13–15 – The Great Blizzard of 1993 strikes the eastern U.S., bringing record snowfall and other severe weather all the way from Cuba to Quebec; it reportedly kills 184 people.
 March 13 – 1993 Australian federal election: Paul Keating's Labor Government is re-elected with an increased majority, defeating the Liberal/National Coalition led by John Hewson.
 March 17 – The Kurdistan Workers' Party announces a unilateral ceasefire in Iraq.
 March 24
 The Israeli Knesset elects Ezer Weizman as President of Israel.
 South Africa officially abandons its nuclear weapons programme. President de Klerk announces that the country's six warheads had already been dismantled in 1989.
 March 27
 Jiang Zemin becomes President of the People's Republic of China.
 Following a rash of integrist murders (including those of foreigners), Algeria breaks diplomatic relations with Iran, accusing the country of interfering in its interior affairs.
 Mahamane Ousmane is elected president of Niger.
 March 28 – 1993 French legislative election: Rally for the Republic (Gaullist party) wins a majority and Édouard Balladur becomes Prime Minister.
 March 29 – The 65th Academy Awards, hosted by Billy Crystal, are held at the Dorothy Chandler Pavilion in Los Angeles, with Unforgiven winning Best Picture.

April
 April–May – 1993 Four Corners hantavirus outbreak: Thirteen people are killed by Hantavirus pulmonary syndrome, mainly in the Southwestern United States.
 April–October – Great Flood of 1993: The Mississippi and Missouri Rivers flood large portions of the American Midwest.
 April 8 – The Republic of Macedonia is admitted to the United Nations.
 April 16 – Bosnian War: the enclave of Srebrenica is declared a UN-protected "safe area".
 April 19 – Waco siege: A 51-day stand-off at the Branch Davidian compound near Waco, Texas, ends with a fire that kills 76 people, including David Koresh.
 April 20 – The Council for National Academic Awards, the national degree-awarding authority in the United Kingdom, is officially dissolved.
 April 21 – The Supreme Court in La Paz, Bolivia, sentences former dictator Luis Garcia Meza to 30 years in jail without parole for murder, theft, fraud and violating the constitution.
 April 23
 The World Health Organization declares tuberculosis a global emergency.
 Eritreans vote overwhelmingly for independence from Ethiopia in a United Nations-monitored referendum, the 1993 Eritrean independence referendum.
 April 26 – Oscar Luigi Scalfaro appoints Carlo Azeglio Ciampi Prime Minister of Italy.
 April 27
 Eritrea: Eritrean independence is declared verified by the United Nations.
 1993 Yemeni parliamentary election: The General People's Congress of Yemen wins a plurality of 121 seats.
 1993 Zambia national football team plane crash: All members of the Zambia national football team die in a plane crash off Libreville, Gabon en route to Dakar, Senegal.
 April 30 – Tennis player Monica Seles – at this time the top-ranked player in women's tennis – is stabbed during a match at the 1993 Citizen Cup in Hamburg, Germany.

May
 May 1
 A Tamil Tigers suicide bomber assassinates President Ranasinghe Premadasa of Sri Lanka. Dingiri Banda Wijetunga becomes the third executive president of Sri Lanka.
 May 4 – UNOSOM II assumes the Somalian duties of the dissolved UNITAF.
 May 9 – Juan Carlos Wasmosy becomes the first democratically elected President of Paraguay in nearly 40 years, after defeating Domingo Laíno in the 1993 Paraguayan general election.
 May 15 – Niamh Kavanagh wins the Eurovision Song Contest for Ireland with In Your Eyes.
 May 16 – The Grand National Assembly of Turkey elects Prime Minister Süleyman Demirel as President of Turkey. After Demirel becomes president, the acting Prime Minister of Turkey is Erdal İnönü of Social Democratic Populist Party for 40 days.
 May 24 – Eritrea gains independence from Ethiopia.
 May 25 – The International Criminal Tribunal for the former Yugoslavia is created in The Hague.
 May 28 – Eritrea and Monaco gain entry to the United Nations.

June
 June 1
 Large protests erupt against Slobodan Milošević's regime in Belgrade; opposition leader Vuk Drašković and his wife Danica are arrested.
 President of Guatemala Jorge Serrano Elías is forced to flee the country after an attempted self-coup.
 1993 Burundian presidential election: The first multiparty elections in Burundi since the country's independence lead to the election of Melchior Ndadaye, leader of the Front for Democracy in Burundi. The next day's legislative election sees his party win with an overwhelming majority.
 June 5
 The National Assembly of Venezuela designates Ramón José Velásquez as successor of suspended President Carlos Andrés Pérez.
 Attack on Pakistani military in Somalia: twenty-four Pakistani troops in the United Nations forces are killed in Mogadishu, Somalia.
 June 6
 Following the Revolutionary Nationalist Movement's victory, Gonzalo Sánchez de Lozada becomes President of Bolivia.
 Mongolia holds its first direct presidential elections, Punsalmaagiin Ochirbat remains president.
 June 8 – Kurdish–Turkish conflict: the PKK-declared ceasefire ends in Iraq.
 June 14 – Multipartyists win a referendum on the future of the one-party system in Malawi.
 June 18 – Iraq disarmament crisis: Iraq refuses to allow UNSCOM weapons inspectors to install remote-controlled monitoring cameras at two missile engine test stands.
 KTTV launched Good Day L.A.: 
 June 22 – Japan's New Party Sakigake breaks away from the Liberal Democratic Party.
 June 24 – UK mathematician Andrew Wiles wins worldwide fame after presenting his proof of Fermat's Last Theorem, a problem that had been unsolved for more than three centuries.
 June 25
 Kim Campbell becomes the 19th, and first female, Prime Minister of Canada.
 Tansu Çiller of True Path Party forms the new government of Turkey.
 Zoran Lilić succeeds Dobrica Ćosić as President of Yugoslavia.
 The litas is introduced as the new currency of Lithuania.
 Jacques Attali resigns as President of the European Bank for Reconstruction and Development.
 June 26–28 – Typhoon Koryn causes massive damage to the Philippines, China and Macau.
 June 27 – U.S. President Bill Clinton orders a cruise missile attack on Iraqi intelligence headquarters in the Al-Mansur District of Baghdad, in response to an Iraqi plot to assassinate former U.S. President George H. W. Bush during his visit to Kuwait in mid-April.

July
 July 5
 Iraq disarmament crisis: UN inspection teams leave Iraq. Iraq then agrees to UNSCOM demands and the inspection teams return.
 Electrochemist Faiza Al-Kharafi is appointed rector (president) of Kuwait University, the first woman to head a major university in the Middle East.
 July 7–9 – The 19th G7 summit is held in Tokyo, Japan.
 July 7 – Hurricane Calvin lands in Mexico. It is the second Pacific hurricane on record to land in Mexico in July and kills 34.
 July 12 – The 7.7  Hokkaidō earthquake affected northern Japan with a maximum Mercalli intensity of VIII (Severe) and triggers a devastating tsunami that kills 230 on the small island of Okushiri, Hokkaido.
 July 19 – 1993 Japanese general election: The loss of majority of the Liberal Democratic Party results in a coalition taking power.
 July 25 – In a terrorist attack members of the Azanian People's Liberation Army open fire on a congregation inside St James Church in Kenilworth, Cape Town, killing eleven and injuring fifty.
 July 26
 Miguel Indurain wins the 1993 Tour de France.
 Asiana Airlines Flight 733 crashes into Mt. Ungeo in Haenam, South Korea; 68 are killed.
 July 29 – The Israeli Supreme Court acquits accused Nazi death camp guard John Demjanjuk of all charges and he is set free.

August
 August – The European Exchange Rate Mechanism margin was expanded to 15% to accommodate speculation against the French franc and other currencies.
 August 5 – The discovery of the Tel Dan Stele, the first archaeological confirmation of the existence of the Davidic line, is announced.
 August 9 – King Albert II of Belgium is sworn into office nine days after the death of his brother, King Baudouin I.
 August 13 – More than 130 die in the collapse of Royal Plaza Hotel at Nakhon Ratchasima in Thailand's worst hotel disaster.
 August 21 – NASA loses radio contact with the Mars Observer orbiter 3 days before the spacecraft is scheduled to enter orbit around Mars.
 August 28 – Ong Teng Cheong becomes the first President of Singapore elected by the population.
 August 31 – Russia completes removing its troops from Lithuania.

September
 September 13
 1993 Norwegian parliamentary election: The Labour Party wins a plurality of the seats and Prime Minister Gro Harlem Brundtland retains office.
 Oslo I Accord: Following initially secret talks from earlier in the year, PLO leader Yasser Arafat and Israeli prime minister Yitzhak Rabin shake hands in Washington, D.C. after signing a peace accord.
 September 15–21 – Hurricane Gert crosses from the Atlantic to the Pacific Ocean through Central America and Mexico.
 September 17 – Russian troops withdraw from Poland.
 September 19 – 1993 Polish parliamentary election: A coalition of the Democratic Left Alliance and the Polish People's Party led by Waldemar Pawlak comes into power.
 September 22 – Big Bayou Canot train disaster: A bridge collapses while the Amtrak Sunset Limited is in the process of crossing it, killing 47 people.
 September 23 – The International Olympic Committee selects Sydney, Australia, to host the 2000 Summer Olympics.
 September 24 – The Cambodian monarchy is restored, with Norodom Sihanouk as king.
 September 26
 The first mission in Biosphere 2 ends after two years.
 PoSAT-1 (the first Portuguese satellite) is launched on board French rocket Ariane 4.
 September 27 – War in Abkhazia: Fall of Sukhumi – Eduard Shevardnadze accuses Russia of passive complicity.
 September 30 – Latur earthquake: A 6.2  earthquake occurs in the vicinity of Maharashtra, India having a maximum Mercalli intensity of VIII (Severe), killing 9,748 and injuring 30,000.

October
 October 3–4– Battle of Mogadishu: The U.S. Army conducts Operation Gothic Serpent in the city of Mogadishu, Somalia, deploying Task Force Ranger. Two U.S. Army UH-60 Blackhawks are shot down and the operation leaves over 1,000 Somalians dead and over 74 Americans wounded in action, 18 killed and 1 captured.
 October 4 – The Russian constitutional crisis culminates with Russian military and security forces, using tanks and clearing the White House of Russia Parliament building by force, quashing a mass uprising against President Boris Yeltsin.
 October 5 – China performs a nuclear test, ending a worldwide de facto moratorium.
 October 10 – The South Korean ferry Seohae capsizes off Pusan, South Korea; 292 are killed.
 October 11–28 – The UNMIH is prevented from entering Haiti by its military-led regime. On October 18, United Nations economic sanctions (abolished in August) are reinstated. U.S. President Bill Clinton sends 6 American warships to enforce them.
 October 13
 1993 Greek legislative election: Andreas Papandreou begins his second term as Prime Minister of Greece.
 The fifth summit of the Francophonie opens in Mauritius.
 The 1993 Finisterre earthquakes in Papua New Guinea kill at least 60 due to landslides.
 October 19 – Benazir Bhutto becomes the Prime Minister of Pakistan for the second time.
 October 21 – A coup in Burundi results in the death of president Melchior Ndadaye and sparks the Burundi Civil War.
 October 25 – 1993 Canadian federal election: Jean Chrétien and his Liberal Party defeat the governing Progressive Conservative Party, which falls to a historic low of two seats.

November

 November 1 – The Maastricht Treaty takes effect, formally establishing the European Union.
 November 4 – Jean Chrétien becomes the 20th Prime Minister of Canada.
 November 5 – The Parliament of the United Kingdom passes the Railways Act 1993, setting out the procedures for privatisation of British Rail.
 November 9 – Bosnian Croat forces destroy the Stari Most, or Old Bridge of Mostar, Bosnia and Herzegovina, by tank fire.
 November 12 – London Convention: Marine dumping of radioactive waste is outlawed.
 November 14 – In a status referendum, residents of Puerto Rico vote by a slim margin to maintain Commonwealth status.
 November 17–22 – The North American Free Trade Agreement (NAFTA) passes the legislative houses in the United States, Canada and Mexico.
 November 17
 In Nigeria, General Sani Abacha ousts the government of Ernest Shonekan in a military coup.
 The first meeting of the Asia-Pacific Economic Cooperation summit opens in Seattle.
 November 20 – An Avioimpex Yakovlev Yak-42D crashes into Mount Trojani near Ohrid, Macedonia. All 8 crew members and 115 of the 116 passengers are killed.
 November 28 – The Observer reveals that a channel of communications has existed between the Provisional Irish Republican Army and the British government, despite the government's persistent denials.
 November 30
 An agreement establishing the Permanent Tripartite Commission for East African Co-operation is signed.
 U.S. President Bill Clinton signs the Brady Handgun Violence Prevention Act.

December

 December 2
 STS-61: NASA launches the Space Shuttle Endeavour on a mission to repair an optical flaw in the Hubble Space Telescope.
 Colombian drug lord Pablo Escobar is gunned down by police.
 December 5
 Omar Bongo is re-elected as President of Gabon in the country's first multiparty elections.
 Rafael Caldera Rodríguez is elected President of Venezuela for the second time, succeeding interim president Ramón José Velásquez.
 December 7
 In Garden City, New York, six people are murdered and 19 injured in the Long Island Rail Road massacre, a racially motivated mass shooting perpetrated by Colin Ferguson, a black Jamaican immigrant.
 The 32-member Transitional Executive Committee holds its first meeting in Cape Town, marking the first meeting of an official government body in South Africa with Black members.
 President of Ivory Coast Félix Houphouët-Boigny dies at 88, the oldest African head of state. He is succeeded four days later by Henri Konan Bédié.
 December 8 – U.S. President Bill Clinton signs into law the North American Free Trade Agreement.
 December 11
 One of the three blocks of the Highland Towers near Kuala Lumpur, Malaysia collapses, killing 48.
 1993 Chilean presidential election: Eduardo Frei Ruiz-Tagle is elected with 58% of the vote.
 December 13
 Former Prime Minister of Canada Kim Campbell resigns as leader of the Progressive Conservative Party and is succeeded as leader by Jean Charest.
 The Majilis of Kazakhstan approves the nuclear Non-Proliferation Treaty and agrees to dismantle the more than 100 missiles left on its territory by the fall of the USSR.
 December 15 – The Uruguay Round of General Agreement on Tariffs and Trade (GATT) talks reach a successful conclusion after seven years.
 December 17 – Brazil's Supreme Court rules that former President Fernando Collor de Mello may not hold elected office again until 2000 due to political corruption.
 December 20
 The United Nations General Assembly votes to appoint a U.N. High Commissioner for Human Rights.
 The first corrected images from the Hubble Space Telescope are taken.    
 December 21 – The Hungarian Parliament elects Péter Boross Prime Minister of Hungary following the death of József Antall on December 12.                      
 December 30
 The Congress Party gains a parliamentary majority in India after the defection of 10 Janata Dal party lawmakers.
 Representatives of Israel and the Holy See sign the Fundamental Agreement Between the Holy See and the State of Israel, preparing for the establishment of diplomatic relations.
 Argentina passes a measure allowing President Carlos Menem and all future presidents to run for a second consecutive term. It also shortens presidential terms to 4 years and removes the requirement for the president to be Roman Catholic.

Date unknown
 Severe floods hit South Asia, killing over 4,000 people in Bangladesh, India and Nepal.

Births

January
 January 1 
 Agustina Albertarrio, Argentine field hockey player
 Sifan Hassan, Ethiopian-born Dutch middle- and long-distance runner
 Larry Nance Jr., American basketball player
 January 2 – Bryson Tiller, American rapper, singer and songwriter
 January 4 – Scott Redding, English Grand Prix motorcycle racer
 January 5 – Jolanda Neff, Swiss mountain biker
 January 6 – Jesús Manuel Corona, Mexican footballer
 January 7 – Jan Oblak, Slovenian footballer
 January 9
 Ashley Argota, American actress and singer
 Katarina Johnson-Thompson, English heptathlete
 Aminata Savadogo, Latvian singer-songwriter
 January 12 
 D.O., South Korean singer and actor
 Zayn Malik, British singer
 January 13
 Max Whitlock, English artistic gymnast
 Tyler Barnhardt, american actor
 January 14 – Mariya Lasitskene, Russian track and field athlete
 January 15 – 
 Kadeem Allen, American basketball player
 Paulina Vega, Colombian model and television presenter
 January 20 – Morgane Polanski, French-Polish actress
 January 22 – Netta Barzilai, Israeli singer
 January 25 – Iris Mittenaere, French beauty queen and model
 January 26 – Anna Schaffelhuber, German para-alpine skier
 January 28
 John Brooks, German-born American soccer player
 Will Poulter, English actor
 January 29 – Kyary Pamyu Pamyu, Japanese model, blogger, and recording artist

February
 February 3 – András Szatmári, Hungarian fencer
 February 5 – Anastasia Voynova, Russian track cyclist
 February 6 – Tinashe, American actress and singer
 February 7 – Diego Laxalt, Uruguayan footballer
 February 9 – Kristin Pudenz, German discus thrower
 February 10 – Mia Khalifa, Lebanese-American media personality
 February 11 
 Karl Geiger, German ski-jumper
 Petr Yan, Russian mixed martial artist
 February 16 – Sōsuke Genda, Japanese baseball player
 February 17
 Elhaida Dani, Albanian singer-songwriter
 Marc Márquez, Spanish six time MotoGP world champion
 February 19 – Victoria Justice, American actress and singer
 February 28 – Emmelie de Forest, Danish singer and songwriter

March
 March 1 – Juan Bernat, Spanish footballer
 March 2
 Pandelela Rinong, Malaysian diver
 Mariya Yaremchuk, Ukrainian pop singer
 March 3 
 Antonio Rüdiger, German footballer
 Stine Skogrand, Norwegian handball player
 Shakhobidin Zoirov, Uzbek boxer
 March 4 
 Bobbi Kristina Brown, American media personality and singer (d. 2015)
 Giuliana Olmos, Mexican tennis player
 March 5
 Fred, Brazilian footballer
 Harry Maguire, English footballer
 March 7 – Mary Earps, English footballer 
 March 8 – Rui Machida, Japanese basketball player
 March 9 – Suga, South Korean rapper and songwriter
 March 10 
 Tatiana Calderón, Colombian race driver
 Nadia Murad, Iraqi Yazidi human rights activist and Nobel Peace Prize winner
Peniel, South Korean based rapper
 March 11
 Jodie Comer, English actress
 Anthony Davis, American basketball player
 March 14 – Anna Ewers, German model
 March 15
 Alia Bhatt, British actress and singer in Bollywood
 Diego Carlos, Brazilian footballer
 Paul Pogba, French footballer
 Mark Scheifele, Canadian ice hockey player
 March 16 – Jeffrey Hoogland, Dutch track cyclist
 March 18 – Mana Iwabuchi, Japanese footballer
 March 19 – Hakim Ziyech, Moroccan footballer
 March 20 – Sloane Stephens, American tennis player
 March 23 – Lee Hyun-woo, South Korean actor and singer
March 24 
 Mackenzie Dern, American mixed martial artist and Brazilian Jiu Jitsu practitioner
 Capitan Petchyindee Academy, Thai Muay Thai kickboxer, Amateur boxer and former ONE Bantamweight Kickboxing World Champion
 March 28 – Juliana Paiva, Brazilian actress
 March 29 – Thorgan Hazard, Belgian footballer
 March 30
 Anitta, Brazilian singer and dancer
 Ji Soo, South Korean actor

April
 April 1 – Janibek Alimkhanuly, Kazakhstani professional boxer
 April 2
 Shin Jae-ha, South Korean actor
 Keshorn Walcott, Trinidadian javelin thrower
 April 10 – Sofia Carson, American actress and singer
 April 12 – Ryan Nugent-Hopkins, Canadian ice hockey player
 April 13 – Darrun Hilliard, American basketball player
 April 16
 Chance the Rapper, American rapper
 Mirai Nagasu, Japanese-American figure skater
 April 17 – Drex Zamboanga, Filipino mixed martial artist and former URCC Bantamweight World Champion
 April 21 – Marius Bear, Swiss singer 
 April 22 – Ryu Hwa-young, South Korean actress and singer
 April 24 – Ben Davies, Welsh footballer
 April 25 – Raphaël Varane, French footballer
 April 26 – Gizem Örge, Turkish volleyball player
 April 28 – Eva Samková, Czech snowboarder
 April 29 – Anna Toman, British field hockey player
 April 30 – Arnór Ingvi Traustason, Icelandic footballer

May
 May 2 – Jarred Brooks, American mixed martial artist  and current ONE Strawweight World Champion
 May 4 
  Marloes Keetels, Dutch field hockey player
 Eivind Tangen, Norwegian handball player
 May 6 – Naomi Scott, English actress, singer and musician
 May 8 – Kayla Williams, American gymnast
 May 9 
 Laura Muir, British middle and long distance runner
 Ryosuke Yamada, Japanese idol
 May 10
 Tímea Babos, Hungarian tennis player
 Halston Sage, American actress
 May 11 – Guo Li, Chinese synchronised swimmer
 May 12 – Wendy Holdener, Swiss alpine skier
 May 13
 Romelu Lukaku, Belgian football player
 Stefan Kraft, Austrian ski jumper
 Debby Ryan, American actress and singer
 Tones and I, Australian singer-songwriter
 May 14
 Miranda Cosgrove, American actress and singer
 Kristina Mladenovic, French tennis player
 May 16
 IU, South Korean singer-songwriter and actress
 Atticus Mitchell, Canadian actor and musician 
 May 18 
 Jiří Prskavec, Czech canoeist
 Jessica Watson, Australian sailor
 May 19 – Jason Kubler, Australian tennis player
 May 22 – Elena Osipova, Russian archer
 May 28 – Jonnie Peacock, English Paralympic athlete
 May 29 – Richard Carapaz, Ecuadorian cyclist

June
 June 2 – Yuki Miyazawa, Japanese basketball player
 June 3 – Sabrina Gonzalez Pasterski, American theoretical physicist
 June 6
 Frida Gustavsson, Swedish model
 Ashley Spencer, American track and field athlete
 June 7
 Swae Lee, American singer, rapper and songwriter
 George Ezra, English singer-songwriter
 Park Ji-yeon, South Korean singer and actress
 June 10 – Chingiz Allazov, Belarusian Kickboxer and current ONE Featherweight Kickboxing World Champion
 June 12 – Robbie Henshaw, Irish rugby union player
 June 13 – Thomas Partey, Ghanaian footballer
 June 14 – Gunna, American rapper
 June 15 – Carolina Marín, Spanish badminton player
 June 16
 Park Bo-gum, South Korean actor
 Alex Len, Ukrainian basketball player
 June 17 – Nikita Kucherov, Russian Ice Hockey player
 June 20 – Sead Kolašinac, German born-Bosinian footballer
 June 21
 Caroline Brasch Nielsen, Danish model
 Matej Palčič, Slovenian footballer
 June 22 
 Darya Dmitriyeva, Russian rhythmic gymnast
 Loris Karius, German footballer
 June 23 – Michelle Jenneke, Australian hurdler and model.
 June 25 
 Barney Clark, British actor
 Hugues Fabrice Zango, Burkinabe triple jumper
 June 26 – Ariana Grande, American singer, songwriter, and actress
 June 27 – Gabriela Gunčíková, Czech singer
 June 28
 Bradley Beal, American basketball player
 Beanie Feldstein, American actress
 Jung Dae-hyun, South Korean singer
 June 29 – Fran Kirby, English footballer
 June 30 – Pedro Pichardo, Cuban-born Portuguese triple jumper

July
 July 1 – Raini Rodriguez, American actress and singer
 July 2
 Yassine Meriah, Tunisian footballer
 Ieva Zasimauskaitė, Lithuanian singer
 Saweetie, American rapper
 July 3
 Mathias Anderle, American singer-songwriter and actor
 Vincent Lacoste, French actor
 July 4 – Mate Pavić, Croatian tennis player
 July 6 
 Jana Burčeska, Macedonian singer
 Pauline Coatanea, French handball player
 July 7
 Ally Brooke, American singer
 Shakhram Giyasov, Uzbekistani boxer
 Grâce Zaadi, French handball player
 July 8 – Ergys Kaçe, Albanian footballer
 July 9 – DeAndre Yedlin, American soccer player
 July 10 – Florian Sénéchal, French racing cyclist
 July 11 – Rebecca Bross, American gymnast
 July 14 
 John Gibson, American Ice Hockey player
 Sayaka Yamamoto, Japanese singer
 July 16
 Alexander Ipatov, Ukrainian-Turkish chess grandmaster
 Ganna Rizatdinova, Ukrainian rhythmic gymnast
 July 18
 Mieke Kröger, German track cyclist 
 Taemin, South Korean singer-songwriter, actor, and dancer.
 July 20
 Alycia Debnam-Carey, Australian actress
 Lucas Digne, French footballer
 July 21 
 Haziq Kamaruddin, Malaysian archer
 Luksika Kumkhum, Thai tennis player
 July 26
 Elizabeth Gillies, American actress
 Taylor Momsen, American singer, songwriter, and model
 Stormzy, English rapper
 July 27 – Jordan Spieth, American golfer
 July 28
 Harry Kane, English footballer
 Cher Lloyd, English singer
 July 30 – Andre Gomes, Portuguese footballer

August
 August 1 
 Mariano Díaz, Spanish born-Domenican footballer
 Demi Schuurs, Dutch tennis player
 Leon Thomas III, American actor and singer
 August 10 – Andre Drummond, American basketball player
 August 11
 Gita Gutawa, Indonesian soprano, actress, and songwriter
 Alireza Jahanbakhsh, Iranian footballer
 Alyson Stoner, American actress, singer and dancer
 August 12
 Ewa Farna, Polish singer
 Luna, South Korean singer, musical actress, and television presenter
 August 13
 Artur Gachinski, Russian figure skater
 Johnny Gaudreau, American ice hockey player
 August 15
 Clinton N'Jie, Cameroonian footballer
 Alex Oxlade-Chamberlain, English footballer
 August 16 – Cameron Monaghan, American actor
 August 17
 Cinta Laura, Indonesian-German singer and actress
 Ederson Moraes, Brazilian football goalkeeper
 Sarah Sjöström, Swedish swimmer
 Yoo Seung-ho, South Korean actor
 August 18
 Jung Eun-ji, South Korean singer, songwriter, actress, and voice actress
 Maia Mitchell, Australian actress and singer
 August 20 – Laura Glauser, French handballer
 August 20 – Millie Bright, English foobts
 August 22 – Laura Dahlmeier, German biathlete
 August 23 – Kristine Breistøl, Norwegian handballer
 August 24 – Marina Rajčić, Montenegrin handballer
 August 26 – Keke Palmer, American actress and singer
 August 28 – Shira Naor, Israeli actress
 August 29 – Liam Payne, British singer-songwriter
 August 31 – Haruka Imai, Japanese figure skater

September
 September 1
 Ilona Mitrecey, French singer
 Silje Norendal, Norwegian snowboarder
 September 3 – Dominic Thiem, Austrian tennis player
 September 4 
 Yannick Carrasco, Belgian footballer
 Aslan Karatsev, Russian tennis player
 September 6 – Liu Hao, Chinese sprint canoeist
 September 7 – Alex Greenwood, English footballer
 September 10 
 Sam Kerr, Australian football player
 Ruggero Pasquarelli, Italian singer and actor
 September 12 – Kelsea Ballerini, American singer
 September 13 – Niall Horan, Irish singer-songwriter
 September 15
 Dennis Schröder, German basketball player
 JP Tokoto, American basketball player
 September 17 – Sofiane Boufal, French-Moroccan footballer
 September 19 – Chan Hao-ching, Taiwanese tennis player
 September 20 
 Julian Draxler, German footballer
 Svetlana Kolesnichenko, Russian synchronised swimmer
 September 21 – Ante Rebić, Croatian footballer
 September 24
 Sonya Deville, American professional wrestler
 Liu Shiying, Chinese javelin thrower
 Ben Platt, American actor and singer
 September 25
 Rosalía, Spanish singer, songwriter and record producer
 Abdel Nader, Egyptian-American basketball player
 September 26 – Michael Kidd-Gilchrist, American basketball player
 September 27
 Peres Jepchirchir, Kenyan marathon runner
 Patrick Mölleken, German actor, dubber, and voice-over artist
 Monica Puig, Puerto Rican tennis player
 September 28 – Jodie Williams, British sprint runner
 September 29
 Hongbin, South Korean singer and actor
 Milad Mohammadi, Iranian footballer
 Carlos Salcedo, Mexican footballer

October
 October 2
 Michy Batshuayi, Belgian footballer
 Lasha Talakhadze, Georgian weightlifter
 October 5 – Jewell Loyd, American basketball player
 October 6 – Adam Gemili, British sprinter
 October 8
 Garbiñe Muguruza, Spanish professional tennis player
 Barbara Palvin, Hungarian model
 Molly Quinn, American actress
 October 9
 Lauren Davis, American tennis player
 Scotty McCreery, American singer
 October 10 – Nako Motohashi, Japanese basketball player
 October 13 – Tiffany Trump, American socialite and model
 October 16
 Wílmar Barrios, Colombian footballer
 Caroline Garcia, French tennis player
 October 19 – Kimberly García, Peruvian racewalker
 October 23 – Fabinho, Brazilian footballer
 October 29 – India Eisley, American actress
 October 31 
 Letitia Wright, Guyanese-British actress
Zarah Sultana, British politician, Member of Parliament for Coventry South

November
 November 4 – Elisabeth Seitz, German artistic gymnast
 November 7 – Dóra Bodonyi, Hungarian sprint canoeist
 November 13 – Julia Michaels, American singer and songwriter
 November 14 – Samuel Umtiti, Cameroonian-French footballer
 November 15
 Paulo Dybala, Argentine footballer
 Melitina Staniouta, Belarusian individual rhythmic gymnast
 November 16
 Pete Davidson, American comedian and actor
 Dakota Earnest, American gymnast
 November 17 – Taylor Gold, American Olympic snowboarder
 November 19 – Suso, Spanish footballer
 November 21 – Elena Myers, American motorcycle racer
 November 22 
 Adèle Exarchopoulos, French actress
 Logan Martin, Australian BMX cyclist
 November 25 – Danny Kent, English motorcycle racer
 November 26 – Kelsey Mitchell, Canadian cyclist
 November 28
 David Nofoaluma, Australian-Samoan rugby league player
 Stephanie Park, Canadian paralympic wheelchair basketball player
 November 29 – David Lambert, American actor
 November 30
 Yuri Chinen, Japanese idol
 Mia Goth, English actress and model

December
 December 1 –  Lalit Upadhyay, Indian field hockey player
 December 4 – Nataša Andonova, Macedonian footballer
 December 5 
 Ross Barkley, English footballer
 Michelle Gisin, Swiss alpine skier
 December 7 – Brandon Moreno, Mexican martial artist fighter
 December 8 – AnnaSophia Robb, American actress, singer and model
 December 9 – Laura Smulders, Dutch racing cyclist
 December 11 
 Kōyō Aoyagi, Japanese baseball player
 Yalitza Aparicio, Mexican actress and preschool teacher
 December 13 – Danielle Collins, American tennis player
 December 12 – Max Rendschmidt, German sprint canoeist
 December 15 – Alina Eremia, Romanian singer
 December 16 – Thiago Braz da Silva, Brazilian pole vaulter
 December 17 – Kiersey Clemons, American actress and singer
 December 18 – Ana Porgras, Romanian artistic gymnast
 December 20
 Andrea Belotti, Italian footballer
 Yana Egorian, Russian sabre fencer
 December 21 – Naomi Yoshimura, Japanese basketball player
 December 22
 Aliana Lohan, American singer, actress, model and television personality
 Raphaël Guerreiro, Portuguese footballer
 Meghan Trainor, American singer-songwriter, musician, and producer
 December 25 – Andrea Drews, American volleyball player
 December 29 
 Ivona Dadic, Austrian athlete
 Moeko Nagaoka, Japanese basketball player

Deaths

January

 January 5
 Juan Benet, Spanish writer (b. 1927)
 Yuri Bezmenov, Soviet KGB informant (b. 1939)
 January 6
 Archduchess Elisabeth of Austria (b. 1922)
 Dizzy Gillespie, American jazz musician (b. 1917)
 Richard Mortensen, Danish painter (b. 1910)
 Rudolf Nureyev, Russian dancer (b. 1938)
 January 9 – Paul Hasluck, Australian politician, 17th Governor-General of Australia (b. 1905)
 January 13 – René Pleven, French politician, 88th Prime Minister of France (b. 1901)
 January 15 – Sammy Cahn, American lyricist (b. 1913)
 January 16
 Glenn Corbett, American actor (b. 1930)
 Jón Páll Sigmarsson, Icelandic strongman (b. 1960)
 January 18 – Eleanor Burford, English writer (b. 1906)
 January 20 – Audrey Hepburn, Belgian-born British actress (b. 1929)
 January 21
 Charlie Gehringer, American baseball player (b. 1903)
 Leo Löwenthal, German sociologist (b. 1900)
 January 22
 Kōbō Abe, Japanese author (b. 1924)
 Jim Pollard, American professional basketball player and coach (b. 1922)
 January 23
 Thomas A. Dorsey, American musician and Christian evangelist, "Father of Gospel Music" (b. 1899)
 Keith Laumer, American science fiction author (b. 1925)
 January 24
 Gustav Ernesaks, Estonian composer and a choir conductor (b. 1908)
 Thurgood Marshall, American jurist, first African-American on the Supreme Court (b. 1908)
 Uğur Mumcu, Turkish journalist and writer (b. 1942)
 January 25 – Hedi Amara Nouira, Tunisian politician, 11th Prime Minister of Tunisia (b. 1911)
 January 26
 Baron Axel von dem Bussche, German military officer, member of the anti-Hitler Resistance (b. 1919)
 Jan Gies, Dutch resistance fighter (b. 1905)
 Robert Jacobsen Danish artist (b. 1912)
 Jeanne Sauvé, Canadian politician, 23rd Governor General of Canada (b. 1922)
 January 27 – André the Giant, French professional wrestler (b. 1946)
 January 30 – Queen Alexandra of Yugoslavia (b. 1921)

February

 February 2 – Alexander Schneider, Lithuanian violinist (b. 1908)
 February 3 – Karel Goeyvaerts, Belgian composer (b. 1923)
 February 5
 Hans Jonas, German philosopher (b. 1903)
 Joseph L. Mankiewicz, American screenwriter and producer (b. 1909)
 February 6 – Arthur Ashe, American tennis player (b. 1943)
 February 9 – Saburo Okita, Japanese politician, Foreign Minister of Japan (b. 1914)
 February 10
 Maurice Bourgès-Maunoury, Prime Minister of France (b. 1914)
 Fred Hollows, New Zealand-Australian ophthalmologist (b. 1929)
 February 11 – Robert W. Holley, American biochemist, Nobel Prize laureate (b. 1922)
 February 18 – Kerry Von Erich, American professional wrestler (b. 1960)
 February 20 – Ferruccio Lamborghini, Italian automobile manufacturer (b. 1916)
 February 21 – Inge Lehmann, Danish seismologist and geophysicist (b. 1888)
 February 22 – Jean Lecanuet, French politician (b. 1920)
 February 23 – Robert Triffin, Belgian economist (b. 1911)
 February 24 – Bobby Moore, English footballer (b. 1941)
 February 25 – Eddie Constantine, American-born French actor and singer (b. 1917)
 February 27 – Lillian Gish, American actress (b. 1893)
 February 28
 Ishirō Honda, Japanese film director (b. 1911)
 Ruby Keeler, American actress (b. 1909)

March

 March 3
 Albert Sabin, American biologist, developer of the oral polio vaccine (b. 1906)
 Carlos Montoya, Spanish flamenco guitarist and a founder of the modern-day popular flamenco style of music (b. 1903)
 March 5 – Cyril Collard, French filmmaker (b. 1957)
 March 8 – Billy Eckstine, American musician (b. 1914)
 March 10 – Dino Bravo, Italian-Canadian professional wrestler (b. 1949)
 March 12 – Wang Zhen, Chinese politician, Vice President of the PRC (b. 1908)
 March 15 – Ricardo Arias, Panamanian politician, 29th President of Panama (b. 1912)
 March 16 – Muhammad Khan Junejo, Pakistani politician, 10th Prime Minister of Pakistan (b. 1932)
 March 17 – Helen Hayes, American actress (b. 1900)
 March 20
 Polykarp Kusch, German-born American physicist, Nobel Prize laureate (b. 1911)
 Paul László, Hungarian-born architect (b. 1900)
 March 24 – John Hersey, American writer and journalist (b. 1914)
 March 27
 Kate Reid, Canadian actress (b. 1930)
 Kamal Hassan Aly, Egyptian politician, 43rd Prime Minister of Egypt (b. 1921)
 March 30
 Andrée Brunet, French pair skater (b. 1901)
 Richard Diebenkorn, American painter (b. 1922)
 March 31
 Brandon Lee, American actor (b. 1965)
 Mitchell Parish, American lyricist (b. 1900)

April

 April 1
 Juan de Borbón y Battenberg, Spanish royal, Count of Barcelona (b. 1913)
 Alan Kulwicki, U.S. race car driver (b. 1954)
 José María Lemus, Salvadorian politician and military officer, 33rd President of El Salvador (b. 1911)
 April 5 – Divya Bharti, Indian film actress (b. 1974)
 April 8 – Marian Anderson, American contralto (b. 1897)
 April 10
 Chris Hani, South African politician (b. 1942)
 Donald Broadbent, British psychologist (b. 1926)
 April 11 – Rahmon Nabiyev, Tajik politician and Communist leader, 2nd President of Tajikistan (b. 1930)
 April 13 – Wallace Stegner, American writer (b. 1909)
 April 15
 Leslie Charteris, British author (b. 1907)
 John Tuzo Wilson, Canadian geophysicist and geologist (b. 1908)
 April 17 – Turgut Özal, Turkish statesman, 19th Prime Minister and 8th President of Turkey (b. 1927)
 April 19 – David Koresh, American spiritualist, leader of the Branch Davidian religious cult (b. 1959)
 April 20 – Cantinflas, Mexican comedian (b. 1911)
 April 23 – Cesar Chavez, Mexican American civil rights activist (b. 1927)
 April 24 – Oliver Tambo, South African activist and former president of the ANC (b. 1917)
 April 29 
 Michael Gordon (film director), American actor and director (b. 1906)
 Mick Ronson, English rock guitarist (b. 1946)

May 

 May 1
 Pierre Bérégovoy, French politician, 111th Prime Minister of France (b. 1925)
 Ranasinghe Premadasa, Sri Lankan statesman, 3rd President of Sri Lanka (b. 1924)
 May 5 – Irving Howe, American writer (b. 1920)
 May 6 – Ann Todd, English actress (b. 1909)
 May 7 – Mary Philbin, American actress (b. 1902)
 May 8
 Avram Davidson, American writer (b. 1923)
 Alwin Nikolais, American choreographer (b. 1912)
 May 9 – Dame Freya Stark, British explorer and travel writer (b. 1893)
 May 12 – Zeno Colò, Italian Olympic alpine skier (b. 1920)
 May 16 – Madan Bhandari, Nepalese politician (b. 1951)
 May 21 – John Frost, English army officer (b. 1912)
 May 22 – Mieczysław Horszowski, Polish pianist (b. 1892)
 May 24 – Juan Jesús Posadas Ocampo Mexican Cardinal (b. 1926)
 May 25 – Horia Sima, Romanian fascist politician (b. 1907)
 May 30 – Sun Ra, American jazz musician (b. 1914)

June

 June 2
 Tahar Djaout, Algerian writer (b. 1954)
 Johnny Mize, American baseball player (b. 1913)
 Norton Simon, American industrialist and philanthropist (b. 1907)
 June 3 – Yeoh Ghim Seng, Singaporean politician, acting President of Singapore (b. 1918)
 June 5 – Conway Twitty, American musician (b. 1933)
 June 6 – James Bridges, American screenwriter and director (b. 1936)
 June 7 – Dražen Petrović, Croatian professional basketball player (b. 1964)
 June 8
 René Bousquet, head of the Vichy France Police (b. 1909)
 Severo Sarduy, Cuban poet (b. 1937)
 June 9
 Arthur Alexander, American musician (b. 1940)
 Alexis Smith, Canadian-born American actress and singer (b. 1921)
 June 10
 Arleen Auger, American soprano singer (b. 1939)
 Richard Webb, American actor (b. 1915)
 June 11
 Bernard Bresslaw, English actor (b. 1934)
 Ray Sharkey, American actor (b. 1952)
 June 13 – Deke Slayton, American astronaut (b. 1924)
 June 15
 John Connally, American politician (b. 1917)
 James Hunt, British racing driver (b. 1947)
 June 19
 William Golding, English writer, Nobel Prize laureate (b. 1911)
 Szymon Goldberg, Polish-born violinist (b. 1909)
 June 22 – Pat Nixon, First Lady of the United States (b. 1912)
 June 24 – Archie Williams, American Olympic athlete (b. 1915)
 June 26 – Roy Campanella, American baseball player (b. 1921)
 June 28
 GG Allin, American punk singer (b. 1956)
 Boris Christoff, Bulgarian opera singer (b. 1914)
 June 29
 Héctor Lavoe, Puerto Rican salsa singer (b. 1946)
 Bentong Kali, Malaysian-Tamil criminal and gangster (b. 1961)
 June 30 – Spanky McFarland, American actor (b. 1928)

July

 July 2 – Fred Gwynne, American actor and comedian (b. 1926)
 July 3
 Don Drysdale, American baseball player (b. 1936)
 Joe DeRita, American comedian (b. 1909)
 July 4
 Anne Shirley, American actress (b. 1918)
 Lola Gaos, Spanish actress (b. 1921)
 July 7 – Mia Zapata, American punk musician (b. 1965)
 July 8 – Abul Hasan Jashori, Bangladeshi Islamic scholar and freedom fighter (b. 1918)
 July 10 – Masuji Ibuse, Japanese writer (b. 1898)
 July 13 – Davey Allison, American stock car driver (b. 1961)
 July 14 – Léo Ferré, French poet and singer-songwriter (b. 1916)
 July 15
 Hugo Ballivián, Bolivian general, 44th President of Bolivia (b. 1901)
 David Brian, American actor (b. 1914)
 July 18 – Jean Negulesco, Romanian-born film director (b. 1900)
 July 19 – Gordon Gray, Scottish cardinal (b. 1910)
 July 25 – Nan Grey, American actress (b. 1918)
 July 26 – Matthew Ridgway, American army general (b. 1895)
 July 27 – Reggie Lewis, American basketball player (b. 1965)
 July 30 – Edward Bernard Raczyński, Polish aristocrat, diplomat, writer, and politician, 8th President of Poland (b. 1891)
 July 31
 Lola Alvarez Bravo, Mexican photographer (b. 1903)
 King Baudouin of Belgium (b. 1930)

August

 August 1 – Claire Du Brey, American actress (b. 1892)
 August 3 – James Donald, Scottish actor (b. 1917)
 August 5 – Eugen Suchoň, Slovak composer (b. 1908)
 August 10
 Euronymous, Norwegian guitarist (b. 1968)
 Irene Sharaff, American costume designer (b. 1910)
 August 16 – Stewart Granger, Anglo-American actor (b. 1913)
 August 19 – Salah Jadid, Syrian general and Ba'athist politician (b. 1926)
 August 21 – Kasdi Merbah, Algerian politician, 4th Prime Minister of Algeria (b. 1938)
 August 22 – Dinmukhamed Kunaev, Kazakh Soviet communist politician (b. 1912)
 August 26 − Roy Raymond, American entrepreneur (b. 1947)
 August 28 – E. P. Thompson, English historian and activist (b. 1924)
 August 30 – Richard Jordan, American actor (b. 1937)

September

 September 1 – Hasan Abdullayev, Azerbaijani physicist and scientist (b. 1918)
 September 4 – Hervé Villechaize, French-born actor (b. 1943)
 September 5 – Baek Du-jin, Korean politician, 4th Prime Minister of the Republic of Korea (South Korea) (b. 1908)
 September 7 – Christian Metz, French film theorist (b. 1931)
 September 9 – Helen O'Connell, American singer (b. 1920)
 September 11 – Erich Leinsdorf, Austrian conductor (b. 1912)
 September 12
 Raymond Burr, Canadian-American actor (b. 1917)
 Charles Lamont, Russian-born film director (b. 1895)
 September 15
 Pino Puglisi, Italian Roman Catholic priest (b. 1937)
 Maurice Yaméogo, Burkinabé statesman, 1st President of Upper Volta, current Burkina Faso (b. 1921)
 September 16 – Oodgeroo Noonuccal, Australian political activist, artist, and educator (b. 1920)
 September 20 – Erich Hartmann, German World War II fighter pilot, highest-scoring fighter ace in world history (b. 1922)
 September 22
 Maurice Abravanel, Greek-born American conductor (b. 1903)
 Nina Berberova, Russian writer (b. 1901)
 September 24
 Bruno Pontecorvo, Italian-Soviet nuclear physicist (b. 1913)
 Ian Stuart Donaldson, English singer (b. 1957)
 September 27 – Jimmy Doolittle, American aviation pioneer (b. 1896)
 September 29 – Gordon Douglas, American film director (b. 1907)

October

 October 5 – Agnes de Mille, American dancer and choreographer (b. 1905)
 October 7 – Cyril Cusack, Irish actor (b. 1910)
 October 11 – Andy Stewart, Scottish singer and entertainer (b. 1933)
 October 12 – Leon Ames, American actor (b. 1903)
 October 17 – Criss Oliva, American metal guitarist (b. 1963)
 October 21 – Melchior Ndadaye, Burundian politician, 4th President of Burundi (b. 1953)
 October 22
 Jiří Hájek, Czech politician and diplomat (b. 1913)
 Said Mohamed Jaffar, former head of State of Comoros (b. 1918)
 October 25
 Danny Chan, Hong Kong singer (b. 1958)
 Vincent Price, American actor (b. 1911)
 October 26 – František Filipovský, Czech actor (b. 1907)
 October 28
 Doris Duke, American heiress and philanthropist (b. 1912)
 Juri Lotman, Russian formalist critic, semiotician, and culturologist (b. 1922)
 October 31
 Federico Fellini, Italian film director (b. 1920)
 Paul Grégoire, Archbishop of Montreal (b. 1911)
 River Phoenix, American actor (b. 1970)

November

 November 1 – Severo Ochoa, Spanish-born biochemist, recipient of the Nobel Prize in Physiology or Medicine (b. 1905)
 November 3 – Leon Theremin, inventor of the theremin (b. 1896)
 November 7 – Adelaide Hall, American jazz singer, entertainer (b. 1901)
 November 9 – Stanley Myers, British film composer (b. 1930)
 November 10 – Alberto Breccia, Argentine comics artist and writer (b. 1919)
 November 12
 Bill Dickey, American baseball player (b. 1907)
 H. R. Haldeman, American political aide and businessman (b. 1926)
 Anna Sten, Ukrainian-born American actress (b. 1908)
 November 14 – Sanzō Nosaka, Japanese Communist politician (b. 1892)
 November 15 – Luciano Leggio, Italian mobster (b. 1925)
 November 16
 Lucia Popp, Slovak soprano (b. 1939)
 Evelyn Venable, American actress (b. 1913)
 November 18 – Fritz Feld, German actor (b. 1900)
 November 19 – Leonid Gaidai, Soviet and Russian comedy film director (b. 1923)
 November 20 – Emile Ardolino, American film director (b. 1943)
 November 21 – Bill Bixby, American actor (b. 1934)
 November 22
 Anthony Burgess, English author (b. 1917)
 Joseph Yodoyman, Chadian politician, 4th Prime Minister of Chad (b. 1950)
 November 24 – Albert Collins, American blues guitarist and singer (b. 1932)
 November 28 – Kenneth Connor, English comedian (b. 1916)
 November 29 – J. R. D. Tata, Indian aviator and businessman (b. 1904)

December 

 December 2 – Pablo Escobar, Colombian drug lord (b. 1949)
 December 4 – Frank Zappa, American guitarist and composer (b. 1940)
 December 5 – Alexandre Trauner, Hungarian set designer (b. 1906)
 December 6 – Don Ameche, American actor (b. 1908)
 December 7
 Wolfgang Paul, German physicist, Nobel Prize laureate (b. 1913)
 Félix Houphouët-Boigny, 1st President of Ivory Coast (b. 1905)
 December 9 – Danny Blanchflower, Northern Ireland international footballer and football manager (b. 1926)
 December 11 – Elvira Popescu, Romanian-French actress (b. 1894)
 December 12 – József Antall, 53rd Prime Minister of Hungary (b. 1932)
 December 14 – Myrna Loy, American actress (b. 1905)
 December 15 – Penaia Ganilau, 1st President of Fiji (b. 1918)
 December 16
 Charles Willard Moore, American architect (b. 1925)
 Kakuei Tanaka, Japanese politician, 40th Prime Minister of Japan (b. 1918)
 Moses Gunn, American actor (b. 1929)
 December 17 – Janet Margolin, American actress (b. 1943)
 December 18 – Sam Wanamaker, American film director and actor (b. 1919)
 December 19 – Michael Clarke, American musician (b. 1946)
 December 20 – W. Edwards Deming, American engineer, professor, author, lecturer, and management consultant (b. 1900)
 December 21 – Gussie Nell Davis, American educator and founder of the Kilgore College Rangerettes (b. 1906)
 December 22
 Don DeFore, American actor (b. 1913)
 Alexander Mackendrick, British-American film director (b. 1912)
 December 23 – James Ellison, American actor (b. 1910)
 December 24
 Norman Vincent Peale, American preacher and writer (b. 1898)
 Yen Chia-kan, Taiwanese politician and 2nd President of the Republic of China (b. 1905)
 Pierre Victor Auger, French physicist (b. 1899)
 December 25 – Princess Marie Adelheid of Lippe-Biesterfeld (b. 1895)
 December 28
 William L. Shirer, American journalist and historian (b. 1904)
 Howard Caine, American actor (b. 1926)
 December 29 – Frunzik Mkrtchyan, Armenian stage and film actor (b. 1930)
 December 31
 İhsan Sabri Çağlayangil, Turkish diplomat and politician (b. 1908)
 Zviad Gamsakhurdia, Georgian politician, 1st President of Georgia (b. 1939)
 Brandon Teena, American murder victim (b. 1972)
 Thomas Watson Jr., American businessman, political figure, and philanthropist (b. 1914)

Nobel Prizes

 Chemistry – Kary Mullis, Michael Smith
 Economics – Robert W. Fogel, Douglass North
 Literature – Toni Morrison
 Peace – Nelson Mandela and F. W. de Klerk
 Physics – Russell Alan Hulse, Joseph Hooton Taylor, Jr.
 Physiology or Medicine – Richard J. Roberts, Phillip Allen Sharp

References

Sources